Akil Valentine Wright (born 13 May 1996) is an English professional footballer who plays as a midfielder for EFL League Two club Stockport County.

Career
Wright started his senior career at Northern Premier League side Ilkeston before moving to Fleetwood Town for an undisclosed fee.

Over the following 3 years, Wright would be loaned out to non-league teams AFC Fylde, Barrow and Wrexham before signing permanently for Wrexham on 3 January 2018.

On 16 September 2020, Wright signed for York City following his release from Wrexham.

On 17 July 2022, Wright signed for EFL League Two side Stockport County, making his fully professional debut on 3 September 2022 in a 1–0 home win against AFC Wimbledon.

References

1996 births
Living people
Association football midfielders
National League (English football) players
English Football League players
Ilkeston Town F.C. players
Fleetwood Town F.C. players
AFC Fylde players
Barrow A.F.C. players
Wrexham A.F.C. players
York City F.C. players
Stockport County F.C. players
English footballers